Route 148 is an east-west highway in Quebec, Canada. It runs from junction of Autoroute 13 and Autoroute 440 in Laval in the Montreal region to the Ontario-Quebec border in L'Isle-aux-Allumettes in western Quebec. For most of its length, Route 148 follows the north shore of the Ottawa River where it acted as the principal route between communities in the Outaouais region until the completion of Autoroute 50 in 2012. At the Ontario-Quebec border in L'Isle-aux-Allumettes Route 148 continues into Ontario as Highway 148.

In Gatineau, Route 148 is concurrent with Autoroute 50 from Maloney Boulevard until the terminus of Autoroute 50 at des Allumettières Boulevard. Route 148 then continues west on des Allumettières Boulevard towards Aylmer. Prior to the opening of des Allumettières Boulevard in 2007, Route 148 was concurrent with Autoroute 5 between the Autoroute 50 junction and Saint-Raymond Boulevard.

The section of Route 148 between Lachute and Buckingham was the only major route on the north shore of the Ottawa River between communities in the eastern Outaouais region and Gatineau and Montreal.  This section, especially the section between Masson-Angers and  Montebello, has been the site of numerous fatal accidents over the last few years. Construction of Autoroute 50 to the north of Route 148 was completed on November 26, 2012, and now provides a faster and safer route between communities in the eastern Outaouais region and Gatineau and Mirabel.

For many years Route 148 included a section of Rue Principale west of A-13 and most of Boulevard Saint-Martin in Laval.

Municipalities along Route 148
Municipalities listed in order from west to east:
 L'Isle-aux-Allumettes
 Waltham
 Mansfield-et-Pontefract
 Fort Coulonge
 Litchfield
 Campbell's Bay
 Bryson
 Shawville
 Bristol
 Pontiac
 Gatineau - (Aylmer / Hull / Gatineau / Masson-Angers)
 Lochaber-Partie-Ouest
 Thurso
 Lochaber
 Plaisance
 Papineauville
 Montebello
 Notre-Dame-de-Bonsecours
 Fassett
 Grenville-sur-la-Rouge (Calumet)
 Brownsburg-Chatham
 Lachute
 Mirabel
 Saint-Eustache
 Laval - (Laval-Ouest / Sainte-Dorothée)

Images

See also
 List of Quebec provincial highways

References

External links 

 Provincial Route Map (Courtesy of the Quebec Ministry of Transportation) 

148